see Dubara Palace for the palace in Cairo

Dobara is a 2004 Indian Hindi-language film directed by Shashi Ranjan on his debut. It stars Jackie Shroff, Mahima Chaudhry and Raveena Tandon. The film is an unlicensed remake of the film Forever Lulu.

Plot
Ranbir and Anjali Saigal, a happily married couple, find themselves in trouble when visited by an escapee from a mental asylum, Ria Deshmukh.

Cast
Jackie Shroff ... 	Ranbir Sehgal
Raveena Tandon ... 	Ria
Mahima Chaudhry ... 	Dr. Anjali Sehgal
Gulshan Grover ... 	Truck driver
Soni Razdan ... 	Mrs. Devika Mehta
Vrajesh Hirjee 		
Seema Biswas		
Moammar Rana

Music
"Tum Abhi The" - Alka Yagnik
"Humnasheen" - Alisha Chinoy, Anu Malik
"Chadha Na Jaave" - Anu Malik
"Goonja HUa Hai" - Alka Yagnik
"Mujhse Kyun Roothe Ho" - Alka Yagnik
""Pyaar Mere" - Jasbir Jassi
"Tum Abhi The (male) - Hariharan

Reception
The film received a mixed reception by critics. Taran Adarsh praised the performances of the main actors and the music by Anu Malik such as 'Humnasheen' and 'Mujhse Kyon Roothe Ho?' but said "the sluggish pace of its narrative and classy treatment act as barricades. And the pre-climax portions, involving the child and the conclusion to the triangle, take the graph of the film downhill."
Rediff.com criticised the script and remarked that "there were too many holes in it" and questioned the choice of film for a debut by the director.

References

External links

2004 films
2000s Hindi-language films
Films scored by Anu Malik
Indian remakes of American films